This is a list of Osamu Tezuka's notable anime work in alphabetical order. This list of anime includes all those listed on Tezuka's official site as well as others that are directly based on his work, but not listed on the site yet. The English translations of the names used are from the original names found on the official Osamu Tezuka website.

Film

Pilot film

Experimental film

PR film

Tezuka Osamu World film

OAV

Television

TV series

TV special

Produced for Nippon TV's 24 hour TV Love Saves the Earth charity program

See also
 List of Osamu Tezuka manga

References

 
Osamu Tezuka
Tezuka, Osamu